The Jake Effect is an American situation comedy starring Jason Bateman, Nikki Cox, and Greg Grunberg. Seven episodes were produced, to premiere in midseason of 2002, but NBC cancelled the series before a single episode aired.

In 2006, Bravo started airing the series in the "Brilliant But Cancelled" block.

Synopsis
Jake Galvin (Jason Bateman) is a successful lawyer who has grown disdainful of his job after his latest successful case allows a client to dump Paradichlorobenzine into the Wabash River. Jake then decides to quit his job and join a program where professionals from other fields become teachers.

Cast
Jason Bateman – Jake Galvin
Greg Grunberg – Nick Case
Leslie Grossman – Kimmy Ponder
Kyle Gass – Mr. Seissner
Patricia Belcher – Vice Principal M. Curtis
Nikki Cox – Liza Wheeler

Episodes
Pilot 
Only Connect
Flight School
Parent Teacher Conference
Don't Mess With Sloppy
The Jerk Who Came
The Intervention

References

External links
 

Unaired television shows